Gerhard Meidell Gerhardsen may refer to:

 Gerhard Meidell Gerhardsen (1848–1912), Norwegian bailiff and politician for the Conservative Party
 Gerhard Meidell Gerhardsen (1885–1931), Norwegian bailiff and politician for the Conservative Party and Centre Party
 Gerhard Meidell Gerhardsen (economist) (1912–1986), Norwegian economist